The Cebu City Sports Center, formerly called as Abellana Sports Complex is a track and field and football stadium located in Cebu City, Philippines. The complex was built by the city to serve as the main venue for the 1994 Palarong Pambansa and accommodate large events of various kinds. It is owned and managed by the Cebu City government. A number of major events have taken place at the Complex, including concerts, sports events, governmental activities, and the Sinulog Festival, which is held there every year. In addition, Philippines Football League club Global Cebu F.C. has made the stadium their home since entering the league in 2017.

The Sinulog Foundation, responsible for the organization of the Sinulog Festival, is taking office in the complex and the Sinulog contest is usually held there.  The Cebu City Sports Complex has been used by the local government to discuss political problems, like population transfer and urban renewal with local neighborhood organizations.

In August 2012, it was announced that the stadium will host its first ever international match, a friendly between Singapore national football team and the Philippines national football team, ending in a 1–0 win for the Philippines. In 2014, the Philippines national team returned to the stadium in a friendly match against Malaysia,  ending in a 0–0 draw.

See also
 Abellana National School
 Cebu FA
 Cebu Coliseum
 Global Cebu F.C.
 Sinulog

References

Buildings and structures in Cebu City
Football venues in the Philippines
Sports in Cebu

External links

Cebu City Sports Centre picture of the main stand